The Lawashi Channel is a river in Kenora District in northwestern Ontario, Canada.

Course
The river is in the Hudson Bay Lowlands and is part of the James Bay drainage basin.

See also
List of rivers of Ontario

References

Sources

Rivers of Kenora District
Tributaries of Hudson Bay